Cymmer Corrwg railway station served the village of Cymmer, in the historical county of Glamorganshire, Wales, from 1918 to 1964 on the South Wales Mineral Railway.

History 
The station was opened in March 1918 by the South Wales Mineral Railway. Its name was changed to Cymmer Corrwg on 17 September 1926 to avoid confusion with the other two Cymmer stations. It was closed to regular passenger traffic on 22 September 1930 but it remained open for miners until 1964.

References

External links 

Disused railway stations in Neath Port Talbot
Railway stations in Great Britain opened in 1918
Railway stations in Great Britain closed in 1930
1918 establishments in Wales
1955 disestablishments in Wales